Grace's Amazing Machines (known as Catie's Amazing Machines and presented by Catie Munnings for the first series) is a television series first shown on CBeebies in October 2018. 

Presenter Grace Webb explains the role and basic mechanics of large and/or fast vehicles, usually ending up in the driving seat for a demonstration.

The format is similar for each episode; Munnings/Webb summons Speedie, a remote controlled car, to deliver an envelope revealing the theme of the episode. Three machines are featured, from which she chooses her favourite. Vox pops with children share their thoughts on the vehicles.

A glam metal soundtrack is provided by The Darkness.

The show's second series premiered on 21 October 2019; Munnings left the series to focus more on her rally racing career after receiving sponsorship from Red Bull, and was replaced by Grace Webb. With this, the series was renamed to Grace's Amazing Machines.

References

External links
 Catie's Amazing Machines (series 1 episode archive) at BBC
 Grace's Amazing Machines (series 2 episode archive) at BBC

2018 British television series debuts
2010s British children's television series
BBC children's television shows
CBeebies
Documentary television series about industry
Television series by BBC Studios
English-language television shows
Automotive television series